The Secret of Polichinelle (French: Le Secret de Polichinelle) is a 1903 comedy play by the French writer Pierre Wolff. A Boulevard farce it premiered at the Théâtre du Gymnase in Paris. It has been adapted into several different languages including English and Spanish. A 1904 American version was translated by Mildred Aldrich and staged at the Harlem Opera House.

Synopsis
A respectable middle-class family discover that their adult son has had an illegitimate child with his mistress. Both husband and wife believe the other does not know and tries to keep it a secret from them.

Film adaptations
It has been adaptated into films on several occasions including: a 1913 short film The Secret of Polichinelle directed by Henri Desfontaines, a 1923 silent film The Secret of Polichinelle directed by René Hervil and a 1936 sound film The Secret of Polichinelle directed by André Berthomieu. The same year a Swedish version The Family Secret was also produced, directed by Gustaf Molander.

References

Bibliography
 Goble, Alan. The Complete Index to Literary Sources in Film. Walter de Gruyter, 1999.
 Mason, Hamilton. French Theatre in New York: A List of Plays, 1899-1939. Columbia University Press, 1940.

1903 plays
French plays adapted into films
Comedy plays
Plays by Pierre Wolff